Goole was a parliamentary constituency centred on the town of Goole in the West Riding of Yorkshire which returned one Member of Parliament (MP) to the House of Commons of the Parliament of the United Kingdom, elected by the first-past-the-post voting system.

It was created for the 1950 general election, and abolished for the 1983 general election.

Boundaries
The Municipal Borough of Goole, the Urban District of Knottingley, and the Rural Districts of Goole, Osgoldcross, and Thorne.

Members of Parliament

Election results

Elections in the 1950s

Elections in the 1960s

Elections in the 1970s

References

External links

Parliamentary constituencies in Yorkshire and the Humber (historic)
Constituencies of the Parliament of the United Kingdom established in 1950
Constituencies of the Parliament of the United Kingdom disestablished in 1983
Goole